The CMLL-Reina International Junior Championship (Campeonato Internacional Junior del CMLL-Reina in Spanish;  in Japanese) was a women's professional wrestling championship promoted by Consejo Mundial de Lucha Libre (CMLL) and Reina Joshi Puroresu. The championship was created in September 2011 in the Universal Woman's Pro Wrestling Reina (UWWR) promotion, later gaining additional recognition from CMLL. Following the dissolution of UWWR in May 2012, the title moved over to Reina X World, later renamed Reina Joshi Puroresu. The title was meant for women who have wrestled for less than ten years.

History 
The creation of CMLL-Reina International Junior Championship was announced on August 7, 2011. The tournament to crown the inaugural champion was featured by wrestlers from Consejo Mundial de Lucha Libre of Mexico and Universal Woman's Pro Wrestling Reina of Japan. Ray became the first champion after defeated Zeuxis in a Two out of three falls match. The final champion was Kaho Kobayashi, who defeated La Jarochita on September 15, 2017, in Tokyo to win the vacant title.

Title history

Combined reigns

Championship tournament 
The tournament to crown the inaugural CMLL-Reina International Junior Champion ran from August 14 to September 10, 2011 and featured seven competitors. The final was held between the Hongkongese Ray and the Puerto Rican Zeuxis.

Notes

References

External links 
CMLL-Reina International Junior Title history at Lucha Wiki

Consejo Mundial de Lucha Libre championships
Women's professional wrestling championships